OTD may refer to:

 OTD (company)
 ObjecTime Developer
 Observed Time Difference, see E-OTD
 Off the derech, a term for someone who has left an Orthodox Jewish community
 Operational Technology Division, part of the FBI's Data Intercept Technology Unit
 Ot Danum language (ISO 639-3 code: OTD)
 Contadora Airport (IATA: OTD), Panama
 Doctor of Occupational Therapy (OTD)
 Old Taiwan dollar, the former currency of Taiwan